Galerie Louise Leiris was a fine art gallery in Paris established by Daniel-Henry Kahnweiler in 1920.

Initially, the business was known as the Galerie Simon.  It was named after Kahnweiler's partner, André Simon.

In 1940, the business was turned over to Louise Leiris, who was Kahnweiler's sister in law.   It was run under her name.

Prominent among the artists who sold paintings through this gallery were Pablo Picasso, André Masson, [Juan Gris]], and [Fernand Leger]].

The gallery continued in business for several decades selling thousands of Picasso, Masson, and Dalí paintings in affordable at the time prices.

Notes

References

Contemporary art galleries in France
1920 establishments in France
Art galleries established in 1920